In the 1939–40 season, USM Blida is competing in the First Division for the 7th season French colonial era, as well as the Forconi Cup. They will be competing in First Division, and the Coupe de la Ligue.

Non-competitive

Pre-season

Overview

League table

Group A

Results

Matches

Coupe de la Ligue d'Alger

Players statistics

|-
! colspan=12 style=background:#dcdcdc; text-align:center| Goalkeepers

|-
! colspan=12 style=background:#dcdcdc; text-align:center| Defenders

|-
! colspan=12 style=background:#dcdcdc; text-align:center| Midfielders

|-
! colspan=12 style=background:#dcdcdc; text-align:center| Forwards

|}

References

External links

USM Blida seasons
Algerian football clubs 1939–40 season